1950 Academy Awards may refer to:

 22nd Academy Awards, the Academy Awards ceremony that took place in 1950
 23rd Academy Awards, the 1951 ceremony honoring the best in film for 1950